The Demjanov rearrangement is the chemical reaction of primary amines with nitrous acid to give rearranged alcohols. It involves substitution by a hydroxyl group with a possible ring expansion. It is named after the Russian chemist Nikolai Jakovlevich Demjanov (Dem'anov, Demianov) (1861–1938).

Reaction mechanism
The reaction process begins with diazotization of the amine by nitrous acid. The diazonium group is a good leaving group, forming nitrogen gas when displaced from the organic structure. This displacement can occur via a rearrangement (path A), in which one of the sigma bonds adjacent to the diazo group migrates. This migration results in an expansion of the ring. The resulting carbocation is then attacked by a molecule of water. Alternately, the diazo group can be displaced directly by a molecule of water in an SN2 reaction (path B). Both routes lead to formation of an alcohol.

Uses
The Demjanov rearrangement is a method to produce a 1-carbon ring enlargement in four, five or six membered rings. The resulting five, six, and seven-membered rings can then be used in further synthetic reactions.

It has been shown that the Demjanov reaction is susceptible to regioselectivity. One example of this is a study conducted by D. Fattori looking at the regioselectivity of the Demjanov rearrangement in one-carbon enlargements of naked sugars. It showed that when an exo methylamine underwent Demjanov nitrous acid deamination, ring enlargement was not produced.

However, when the endo methylamine underwent the same conditions, a mixture of rearranged alcohols were produced.

Problems
This rearrangement also leads to a substituted, but not expanded, byproduct. Thus it can be difficult to isolate the two products and acquire the desired yield. Also, stereoisomers are produced depending on the direction of addition of the water molecule and other molecules may be produced depending on rearrangements.

Future uses
Current research is exploring the possibilities of various directing groups to influence the selectivity of products in the Demjanov rearrangement, such as tin or silicon.This may lead to increased success with the Demjanov, as it would allow more control in the reaction and increase the desired product yield. The rearrangement is incredibly useful, but using it can sometimes prove ineffective by the difficulty of creating the preferred product. Thus if directing groups are possible, this would greatly improve the applicability of the Demjanov.

Variations

Tiffeneau-Demjanov rearrangement
The Tiffeneau-Demjanov rearrangement (after Marc Tiffeneau and Nikolai Demjanov) is a variation of the Demjanov rearrangement, which involves both a ring expansion and the production of a ketone by using sodium nitrite and hydrogen cation. Using the Tiffeneau-Demjanov reaction is often advantageous as, while there are rearrangements possible in the products, the reactant always undergoes ring enlargement. As in the Demjanov rearrangement, products illustrate regioselectivity in the reaction. Migratory aptitudes of functional groups dictate rearrangement products.

Use of diazomethane
Diazomethane also produces ring enlargement, and its reaction is mechanistically similar to the Tiffeneau-Demjanov rearrangement.

See also
 Wagner–Meerwein rearrangement
 Tiffeneau–Demjanov rearrangement

References
  
  
   (Review)
  
 
 
 
 
 
 
 
 

Rearrangement reactions
Name reactions